Porco Municipality is the third municipal section of the Antonio Quijarro Province in the Potosí Department in Bolivia. Its seat is Porco.

Geography 
Some of the highest mountains of the municipality are listed below:

Subdivision 
The municipality consists of the following cantons: 
 Churcuita
 Kunturiri
 Karma
 Porco
 Chaquilla

The people 
The people are predominantly indigenous citizens of Quechua descent.

See also 
 Warawara Lake

References

External links 
Porco Municipality: population data and map

Municipalities of Potosí Department